Gogi may refer to:

Gogigui (also known as Korean barbecue), a popular method in Korean cuisine of grilling meat
Hwandan Gogi, a compilation of texts on ancient Korean history
Gogi, a comic-strip and character by Pakistani cartoonist Nigar Nazar

People with the given name
Gogi Alauddin (born 1950), Pakistani former squash player
Gogi Grant (1924–2016), American singer
Gogi Koguashvili (born 1974), Georgian-Russian former Greco-Roman wrestler and 1992 Olympic bronze medalist
Gogi Saroj Pal (born 1945), Indian artist and painter